This is a list of writings published by Miroslav Krleža.

Works

 Legenda (1914)
 Maskereta (1914)
 Zaratustra i mladić (1914)
 Pan (1917)
 Tri simfonije (1918)
 Jesenja pjesma (1918)
 Žene na kiši (1918)
 Pjesme I. (1918)
 Pjesme II. (1918)
 Balada (1918)
 Vita nouva (1918)
 Badnja noć (1918)
 Saloma (1918)
 Kristofor Kolumbo (1918)
 Pjesme III. (1919)
 Michelangelo Buonarroti (1919)
 Lirika (1919)
 Jesenja noć (1919)
 U predvečerje (1919)
 Veliki meštar sviju hulja (1919)
 Jutarnja pobjeda nad tminom (1919)
 Jutro pred kišu (1919)
 Hodorlahomor Veliki (1919)
 Baraka pet Be (1921)
 Magyar királyi honvéd novella (1921)
 Hrvatska rapsodija (1921)
 Smrt Franje Kadavera (1921)
 Tri domobrana (1921)
 Piščeva opaska (1921)
 Domobran Jambrek (1921)
 Mlada misa Alojza Tičeka (1921)
 Adam i Eva  (1922)
 Galicija (1922)
 Smrt Florijana Kranjčeca (1922)
 Golgota (1922)
 Zeleni barjak (1922)
 Madžarska varijacija (1922)
 Hrvatski bog Mars  (1922)
 Tri kavaljera frajle Melanije (1922)
 Vučjak (1922)
 In extermis (1923)
 Ver sacrum (1923)
 Membra disiecta (1923)
 Exodus u jesen (1923)
 Domobrani Gebeš i Benčina razgovaraju o Lenjinu (1924)
 Na samrti (1924)
 Smrt Tome Bakrana (1924)
 Vjetrovi nad provincijalnim gradom (1924)
 Smrt bludnice Marije (1924)
 Djevojka među zvijerima (1924)
 Smrt Rikarda Harlekinija (1925)
 Čežnja (1925)
 Izlet u Rusiju (1926)
 Gospoda Glembajevi (1928)
 Ljubav Marcela Faber-Fabriczyja za gospođicu Lauru Warroniggovu (1928)
 U agoniji (1928)
 Badnjak (1928)
 U magli (1928)
 Lirska varijacija o jesenjem sutonu (1928)
 Hiljadu i jedna smrt (1928)
 Dobrotvori (1929)
 Kako je doktor Gregor prvi put u životu susreo Nečastivoga (1929)
 Karijera viteza Olivera Urbana (1929)
 Svadba velikog župana Klanfara (1929)
 Sprovod u Teresienburgu (1929)
 Klanfar na Varadijevu (1930)
 Mladić nosi svoje prve pjesme na ogled (1930)
 Dubrovačka kulisa (1931)
 Pjesma toreadora (1931)
 Lišće na dalekom putu (1931)
 Jesenja samoća (1931)
 Gola žena na staroj slici (1931)
 Knjiga pjesama (1931)
 Čovjek poslije svoje smrti hoda gradom (1931)
 Dijana u gradu (1931)
 Ljudi u tmini (1931)
 Bonaca u predvečerje (1931)
 Maršal Kuroki pokazuje međunarodnim atašeima kod svoga generalnog štaba bojište na Liaoyangu, u noći između drugog i trećeg septembra devet stotina i četvrte na punoj mjesečini (1931)
 Krčma u luci (1931)
 Jeruzalemski dijalog (1931)
 Gospođa u posjeti kod bolesnog djeteta svoje sluškinje (1931)
 Leda (1932)
 O Glembajevima (1932)
 Knjiga lirike (1932)
 Povratak Filipa Latinovicza (1932)
 Legende (1933)
 U logoru (1934)
 Kamo plove ovi gradovi? (1934)
 Balade Petrice Kerempuha (1936)
 Pjesme u tmini (1936)
 Novele (1937)
 Pod maskom (1937)
 Knjiga proze (1938)
 Na rubu pameti (1938)
 Banket u Blitvi (1938)
 Dijalektički antibarbarus (1939)
 Krokodilina ili razgovor o istini (1945)
 Aretej ili Legenda o Svetoj Ancili Rajskoj Ptici  (1952)
 Žuta lopta  (1952)
 Bdijemo  (1954)
 Jednog kišnog dana  (1954)
 Fantaisie musicale  (1954)
 Bila je mjesečina  (1954)
 Zastave  (1962)
 Poezija  (1969)

References
 Djela Miroslava Krleže